Syiah Kuala University, abbreviated as USK (formerly: Unsyiah), founded on 2 September 1961, is the largest and the oldest national university in Banda Aceh, Indonesia. The name of the university is taken from the prominent theologian, Tengku Abdur Rauf As Singkili, who lived in the 16th century.

USK has twelve faculties, providing Associate, Bachelor, and master's degrees. USK has 131 laboratories for student lab work, student and lecturer experiments, and community service. The laboratories are spread across departments and faculties as follows: economics 2, veterinary science 11, law 1 engineering 29, agriculture 17, medical 27, mathematics and natural sciences 26, and one integrated laboratory.

History
In the government's period of Sultan Iskandar Muda, Aceh became the science development centre. The students and the teachers came from around the world, such as Turkish Sultanate, Iran, and India.  During 1957, the beginning of the Acehnese Province was formed, the leaders of the Acehnese government agreed to place the foundation for the development of Acehnese regional education. On 21 April 1958, Yayasan Dana Kesejahteraan Aceh (YDKA) was formed.

YDKA was led by Regent M. Husen and afterward by Governor Ali Hasjmy. On 29 June 1958, the ruler of the Acehnese formed a special commission. The creator's commission was chaired by Governor Ali Hasjmy and Lieutenant Colonel T. Hamzah as the vice-chairman. His first work was to create Darussalam city as for student's city and Syiah Kuala for the name of university. Efforts were carried out by YDKA with the founder of the commission to bring about the Darussalam development and Syiah Kuala University.

The student's city of Darussalam was officially opened by President Sukarno on 2 September 1959, accompanied by the cover opening of the Darussalam monument and the appointment of the first faculty of the Syiah Kuala University: the Faculty of Economics. The next 2 September was appointed as the Day of Education of Nanggroe Aceh Darussalam and is commemorated every year by the Acehnese people.

The embryo of USK was begun from the Faculty of Economics and was continued with the formation of the Faculty of Veterinary Science and Animal Husbandry in 1960. USK as a university officially began on 21 June 1961. Along with that, USK opened the Faculty of Teacher Training and Pedagogy, and the Law Faculty and Human Knowledge. The development was followed by the founding of the Engineering Faculty, Agricultural Faculty, General Medicine Faculty, and Mathematic and Natural Science Faculty.

In 1998, Syiah Kuala University received a new student for a doctorate degree program in the field of Economic Knowledge.

Since being established, USK has been led by Colonel M. Jasin, Drs. Marsuki Nyak Man. A. Madjid Ibrahim, henceforth Prof. Dr. Ibrahim Hasan, MBA., Prod. Dr. Abdullah Ali, M.Sc., Dr. M. Ali Basyah Amin, MA., Prof. Dr. Dayan Dawood, MA., Pfeuidrof. Dr. Abdi A. Wahab, M.Sc, Prof. Dr. Darni M. Daud, M.A, and now headed by Prof. Dr. Ir. Samsul Rizal, M.Eng.

Faculties and departments

There are twelve faculties for undergraduate programs and seven faculties for graduate programme.

Undergraduate programs
 Faculty of Economics: departments of development studies, management, and accounting.
 Faculty of Veterinary Science: department of veterinary clinic
 Faculty of Law Science: department of law science
 Faculty of Engineering: departments of civil engineering, mechanical engineering, chemical engineering, electrical engineering, architecture, mining engineering, industry engineering and geophysics engineering.
 Faculty of Agriculture: departments of cultivation agronomy, soil science, animal husbandry product, post-harvest technology, agricultural engineering, agribusiness agricultural socioeconomics, and pest and plant disease.
 Faculty of Teacher Training & Education: Social sciences education — departments of civic education, history education, economics education, and language education; Mathematics and natural science education — departments of biology education, physics education, mathematics education, and chemistry education; Technology and vocational education — departments of family welfare education, physical & health recreation education, and art education
 Faculty of Medicine Education: department of general physician education
 Faculty of Mathematics & Natural Science: departments of mathematics, physics, chemistry, biology, informatics, statistics, and pharmacy
 Faculty of Social and Political Science Communication: departments of communication, sociology, and politics
 Faculty of Marine & Fishery Aquacultural: departments of aquaculture, and marine science
 Faculty of Dentistry : Department of Dentistry
 Faculty of Nursing

Graduate programs
 Faculty of Economics: master's degrees and doctoral degrees in development studies, management and accounting
 Faculty of Veterinary Science: master's degree for veterinary clinic
 Faculty of Law Science: master's degree for law science
 Faculty of Engineering: master's degree for civil engineering, mechanical engineering, and chemical engineering
 Faculty of Agriculture: master's degrees for natural resource conservation
 Faculty of Teacher Training & Education: master's degrees for management education, English education, language and Indonesian and local languages literature education, physical and health education
 Faculty of Mathematics & Natural Science : master's degree for Mathematics, Physics, Chemistry, and Biology
 Faculty of Medicine Education: master's degree for surgery science
 Faculty of Agriculture: master's degree for Agroecotechnology

Supporting facilities 
Syiah Kuala university has sport facilities such as tennis court, softball field, and football stadium. There are auditorium facilities, the Academic Activity Center (AAC) Building of Prof. Dr. Dayan Dawood, MA. Other facilities are telephone shop, internet cafe, post office, bank and ATM, public health center are on campus.

Office of Administration Center 
The Administration Center is a unit of the administration in the university consisting of several bureaus: Financial Administration Bureau, Academic Administration Bureau, Student Administration Center, and the Planning and Information Center.

Academic Activity Centre 
Academic Activity Center or Multipurpose Building is a facility donated by OECF, Japan. The construction was completed in 2003. The building is used for activities by campus or public.

Academic, research, and student service units
The academic service unit includes the Language Center, Manpower Service Center, Guidance and Counseling Center, Printing Unit, Student Clinic, Experiment Garden, Garage, General Course Unit, Intellectual Property Right Center, Center for the Arts, American Corner/American Study Center, Living Environment Research Center, Population and Human Resource Research, Science and Technology Research, Student Dormitory, Education Research and Development Center, Women Study Center, Traditional Food Study Center, Marine Science Center, Center for Research, Development and Training in Agriculture, customary Law Study center, Human Rights Study Center, and Center for Peace and Conflict Resolution Studies.

Division and technical implementation units
Syiah Kuala University has two division and two technical implementation units. They are Research Center and Community Service Center, Computer and Information System Center, and University Library. The library has intranet and internet connection with textbooks, reference, journals, serials, scientific writings provided by the society of academicians from Syiah Kuala University.

Quality assurance body
An academic quality assurance system was established in 2006. The organizational structure of this body includes quality assurance at the university, faculty and department/field of study levels. At the university level, it is called the Quality Assurance Body. At the faculty level, it is called the Faculty Quality Assurance Unit, and at the department/field of study level, it is called the Academic Quality Assurance Team. At the academic staff level, there is a quality control cluster. The QA system has the motto "Keeping The Quality, Increasing The Competitiveness".

Islamic Center
The university provides infrastructure to support spiritual development through an Islamic Center. The complex of Islamic Center is under renovation to provide it with more comfort for religious activities. Madrasah Dinayah Mosque will be relocated to the Islamic Center complex. This center is planning to conduct studies on Islam, such as the spreading of Islam in Indonesia, the contribution of Fiqh Islam in the development of Indonesia literature, Islamic architecture and other matters related to Islam, as it is the only religion embraced by the Acehnese community.

Notable alumni
Azriana Manalu, women's rights activist and lawyer

See also
SMA Labschool Unsyiah

References

External links 

Syiah Kuala University official webpage 
Syiah Kuala Graduate program official website 
Syiah Kuala Library official website 

Education in Aceh
Universities in Aceh
Universities in Indonesia
Nursing schools in Indonesia
Buildings and structures in Banda Aceh
Indonesian state universities